Boran (also known as Bora–Muinane, Bora–Muiname, Bóran, Miranyan, Miranya, Bórano) is a small language family, consisting of just two languages.

Languages
The two Boran languages are:
Bora (also known as Bora–Miranya, Boro, Meamuyna) of western Brazil (Amazonas State)
Muinane (also known as Bora Muinane, Muinane Bora, Muinani, Muename) of southwestern Colombia (Amazonas Department)

Loukotka (1968) also lists Nonuya, spoken at the sources of the Cahuinari River, as a Boran language. Only a few words were documented.

Synonymy note:

 The name Muiname has been used to refer to the Muinane language (Bora Muinane) of the Boran family and also to the Nipode language (Witoto Muinane) of the Witotoan family.

Genetic relations
Aschmann (1993) proposed that the Boran and Witotoan language families were related, in a Bora–Witoto stock. Echeverri & Seifart (2016) refute the connection.

Language contact
Jolkesky (2016) notes that there are lexical similarities with the Choko, Guahibo, Tukano, Witoto-Okaina, Yaruro, Arawak, and Tupi language families due to contact in the Caquetá River basin region.

An automated computational analysis (ASJP 4) by Müller et al. (2013) found lexical similarities with Arawakan (especially the Resigaro language in particular) due to contact.

Vocabulary
Loukotka (1968) lists the following basic vocabulary items.

{| class="wikitable sortable"
! gloss !! Bora !! Imihitä !! Muinane
|-
! one
| dzonére || tenétogüné || sánótro
|-
! two
| miniékeʔe || mibákö || minóke
|-
! head
| mée-níguoe || mé-eníkoae || nígai
|-
! eye
| ma-ádzik || ma-átxe || adíge
|-
! tooth
| mée-goaxé || me-kuáxe || ígaino
|-
! man
| guáxpi || koaxpí || gáife
|-
! water
| néspakio || nögʔbögʔkó || negfuáyu
|-
! fire
| köxögua || kixúgua || köxögai
|-
! sun
| nöʔögbwa || nöxbá || neʔegbua
|-
! maize
| öxeʔe || öxehu || bédya
|-
! jaguar
| oíbe || ouíbe || höku
|}

Proto-language

Proto-Bora–Muinane reconstructions by Seifart and Echeverri (2015):

References

Bibliography
 Aschmann, Richard P. (1993). Proto Witotoan. Publications in linguistics (No. 114). Arlington, TX: SIL & the University of Texas at Arlington.
 Campbell, Lyle. (1997). American Indian languages: The historical linguistics of Native America. New York: Oxford University Press. .
 Echeverri, Juan Alvaro & Frank Seifart. (2016). Proto-Witotoan: A re-evaluation of the distant genealogical relationship between the Boran and Witotoan linguistic families.
 Kaufman, Terrence. (1990). Language history in South America: What we know and how to know more. In D. L. Payne (Ed.), Amazonian linguistics: Studies in lowland South American languages (pp. 13–67). Austin: University of Texas Press. .
 Kaufman, Terrence. (1994). The native languages of South America. In C. Mosley & R. E. Asher (Eds.), Atlas of the world's languages (pp. 46–76). London: Routledge.
Thiesen, W.; Thiesen, E. (1998). Diccionario: Bora - Castellano, Castellano - Bora. (Serie Lingüística Peruana, 46). Pucallpa: Summer Institute of Linguistics.
Walton, J. W.; Walton, J. P.; Pakky de Buenaventura, C. (1997). Diccionario bilingüe muinane-español, español-muinane. Santafé de Bogotá: Editorial Alberto Lleras Camargo.

External links

 Proel:
 Sub-familia Bóran

 
Bora–Witoto languages
Indigenous languages of the South American Northern Foothills
Indigenous languages of Western Amazonia
Language families